Titkanlu (also Romanized as Tītkānlū, Tatīgānlū, and Tītgānlū; also known as Tīkānlū) is a city in Titkanlu Rural District, Khabushan District, Faruj County, North Khorasan Province, Iran. According to the 2006 census, it had a population of 3,630 people, divided into 950 families.

References 

Populated places in Faruj County
Cities in North Khorasan Province